Teenage Hitchhikers is a 1975 American comedy road movie written, directed, and produced by Gerri Sedley. Chris Jordan and Sandra Peabody star as Mouse and Bird, two runaway teenage girls that embark on a journey across the West in search of freedom and excitement. To fund their travels, they rob the upper class and the various people that sexualize them along the way.

Cinematographer Bill Lamond signed on to the project after being approached by Sedley to work on the film. Both were working for the same television advertisement company at the time. Production began in September 1974 and lasted for a week on a budget of $15k. It was released into drive-in theaters in 1975 to generally favorable reviews that highlight the comedic timing of Jordan and Peabody and the film's social commentary.

The film is one of filmmaker Quentin Tarantino's favorite films and got included in the sixth semi-annual lineup of his Quentin Tarantino Film Festival in 2005 in Austin, Texas.

Plot 
Mouse and Bird are struggling to find assistance in traveling west in an attempt to start a new life. After several failed attempts at hitchhiking, a rock band traveling with a pair of groupies in a recreational vehicle pulls over and allows the girls inside. After the band performs a song, they state that they will not provide them with transportation unless the duo agree to have sexual intercourse with them. They immediately decline as they refuse to be objectified. Thus, Mouse and Bird are kicked out of the vehicle.

After traveling across the highway, the girls approach a river where Bird unintentionally catches a trout in her underwear. Having gone days without food due to not having any money, they perform a brief striptease in a nearby diner in an attempt to get their meal paid for by a middle aged customer but to no avail. Not wanting to be victimized, Mouse and Bird decide that they need to be the ones taking advantage of people in their predicaments in order to obtain money.

Subsequently, they hear reports of an escaped rapist and are told not to hitch-hike. In the woods, the rapist from the news reports attempts to assault a young girl named Jennie. Mouse and Bird devise a plan to save her and tie the rapist up. Jennie decides to join them with their travels. Upon buying a car with money they obtained, the girls soon find themselves involved in an orgy. The next morning, they find their purses and car stolen and realize they are in the same dire predicament they started out in.

Cast 
 Chris Jordan (as Kathie Christopher) as Mouse 
 Sandra Peabody as Bird
 Claire Wilbur as Toni Blake
 Nikki Lynn as Jennie
 Margaret Whitton as Sola Alcoa
 Peter Carew as Dick Daggart (Boutique Owner)
 Kevin Andre as Farquart (Bruce
 Donald Haines as Kiely / Mongo Donny
 Ric Mancini as Rapist
 Bill La Mond as Chauffeur

Production
Sedley and cinematographer Bill Lamond were working in the television advertisement industry. This industry is where the two met each other while working for the same company. Sedley approached Lamond for the project, and he signed on. Filming took place over a week in September 1974 in Greene County, New York, on a low-budget of $15k. Filming took place at four different locations within the area. Both Sedley and Lamond recollects filming as challenging due to the temperature (as the film got shot on live locations.) A deal got made between the filmmakers and actors auditioning; actors would be paid half before the film's release and receive the other half of payment after releasing into drive-ins and theaters. Sedley approached several talent agents who brought actors to read for the project like Peabody, Jordan, Lynn, and Mancini—he liked Peabody, describing her as being the "smartest one," of the cast. He also enjoyed working with Mancini, recollecting him as being very interesting. The actors came in to read for the script, and if their reading impressed Sedley, he hired them. The cast and crew stayed at a motel in Upstate New York that Sedley knew of—the motel accommodated and provided food for them.

Reception
In a mixed review for Los Angeles Times, Linda Gross criticized the storyline of the film stating that it "makes an attempt at parody but succumbs rather quickly to a trashy, episodic treatment of runaway girls whose motto is "the rip-off world is our bag." She praised certain parts of the script for being "funny and farcical" but described the dialogue as being cynical. Gross commended the lead performances of Christopher and Peabody but was critical of Lynn's portrayal, stating "Ms. Christopher and Ms. Peabody are ingenious as the juvenile adventuresses. Ms. Lynn is insipid as the professional virgin."

In a complimentary review, Ian Jane of DVD Talk praised the performances of the lead actors and the storyline of the film for capturing the era in which it was made but was critical of certain scenes lasting too long, stating the following:
"Jordan and Peabody make for likeable leads here. While they're basically taking advantage of anyone they can, not always the most likeable of qualities, they do so with a wink and a nod and a great sense of humor and actually prove pretty capable in the comedic timing department."

"There are a couple of scenes where the joke goes on too long - a moment where, along with Lynn they try on clothes in a boutique much to the delight of the peeping tom shopkeeper could have easily been cut in half - but generally the picture goes by at a good clip and never overstays its eight minute running time. Not all of the comedic bits work as well as others, but the good outweighs the bad and the film is funny enough to succeed. The sex is graphic, even by the standards of a seventies drive-in film, and the nudity quite plentiful."

"Teenage Hitch-Hikers isn't for the puritanical viewer, rather, it's very much a product of its time as it delivers all manner of scenes of wanton sexuality and screwy comedy. It's hardly a politically correct film, but that's half of its charm right there. Enjoy it as a time capsule or as eighty minutes of attractive naked women and cornball humor, but either way the film is a blast and comes recommended to those with an appreciation for such things.

Loron Hays of Reel Reviews wrote that the film "works best when it subverts the genre of sex comedies," and places the women in an empowering position. Hays highlights the chemistry between Jordan and Peabody, the eccentric characters, the screwball comedy, and the film's social commentary.

References

External links 
 

1975 films
American crime comedy films
American independent films
Films set in 1975
1970s crime comedy films
Teensploitation
1975 comedy films
American coming-of-age comedy films
1970s coming-of-age comedy films
1970s English-language films
1970s American films